Jules de Rohan (Jules Hercule Mériadec; 25 March 1726 – 10 December 1800) was Prince of Guéméné. Born in Paris, he died in Carlsbourg.

Biography

Jules was the oldest son of Hercule Mériadec, Prince of Guéméné (1688–1757) and Louise Gabrielle Julie de Rohan (1704–1741), daughter of Hercule Mériadec de Rohan, Prince of Soubise and Anne Geneviève de Lévis

On 10 February 1743 he married Marie Louise de La Tour d'Auvergne (1725–1793), daughter of Charles Godefroy de La Tour d'Auvergne, Duke of Bouillon (1706–1771) and Maria Karolina Sobieska.

Jules and Marie Louise had only one son, Henri Louis de Rohan, who married a cousin, Victoire de Rohan, daughter of Charles de Rohan, Prince of Soubise and Anne Therese of Savoy.

The Prince of Guéméné died in Belgium aged 74, his son, daughter-in-law and grandchildren fled to Bohemia before the French Revolution, his wife having predeceased him in 1788.

Issue

Henri Louis Marie de Rohan, Duke of Montbazon, Prince of Guéméné (31 August 1745–1809) married Victoire de Rohan and had issue; she was the sister of the Princess of Condé and posthumous step daughter of Madame de Soubise.

Siblings

Hercule Mériadec and Louise Gabrielle's children:

Charlotte Louise de Rohan, Mademoiselle de Rohan (12 March 1722 – October 1786) married Vittorio Filippo Ferrero Fieschi, Prince of Masserano and had issue
Généviève Armande Elisabeth de Rohan, Abbess of Marquette (18 November 1724 – 1766) never married
Marie Louise de Rohan (1728 – 31 May 1737) died in infancy
Louis Armand Constantin de Rohan, Prince de Montbazon (18 April 1731 – 24 July 1794) married Gabrielle Rosalie Le Tonnelier de Breteuil, daughter of François Victor Le Tonnelier de Breteuil, no issue; Louis Armand was guillotined in the revolution
Louis René Édouard de Rohan, Cardinal de Rohan (25 September 1734 – 16 February 1803) Archbishop of Strasbourg, no issue
Ferdinand Maximilien Mériadec de Rohan, Archbishop of Cambrai (7 November 1738 – 30 October 1813) had illegitimate children with Charlotte Stuart, Duchess of Albany, daughter of Charles Edward Stuart and Clementina Walkinshaw

Ancestry

1726 births
1800 deaths
Jules
18th-century French nobility
19th-century French nobility
Nobility from Paris
Jules Hercule Meriadec
Jules